Alex Smith is a former football (soccer) player who represented New Zealand at international level.

Smith made a solitary official international appearance for New Zealand in a 0–0 draw with Iran on 12 August 1973.

References 

Year of birth missing (living people)
Living people
New Zealand association footballers
New Zealand international footballers
Association footballers not categorized by position